The Wrestling competition in the 1981 Summer Universiade were held in Bucharest, Romania.

Medal summary

Freestyle

Greco-Roman

Medal table

References

1981 Summer Universiade
1981
Universiade